John Wetzel may refer to:

John Wetzel (basketball) (born 1944), former professional basketball player
John Wetzel (American football) (born 1991), professional American football player
John Wetzel (Pennsylvania official), Pennsylvania Secretary of Corrections